The Koch snowflake (also known as the Koch curve, Koch star, or Koch island) is a fractal curve and one of the earliest fractals to have been described. It is based on the Koch curve, which appeared in a 1904 paper titled "On a Continuous Curve Without Tangents, Constructible from Elementary Geometry" by the Swedish mathematician Helge von Koch.

The Koch snowflake can be built up iteratively, in a sequence of stages.  The first stage is an equilateral triangle, and each successive stage is formed by adding outward bends to each side of the previous stage, making smaller equilateral triangles.  The areas enclosed by the successive stages in the construction of the snowflake converge to  times the area of the original triangle, while the perimeters of the successive stages increase without bound. Consequently, the snowflake encloses a finite area, but has an infinite perimeter.

Construction
The Koch snowflake can be constructed by starting with an equilateral triangle, then recursively altering each line segment as follows:
 divide the line segment into three segments of equal length.
 draw an equilateral triangle that has the middle segment from step 1 as its base and points outward.
 remove the line segment that is the base of the triangle from step 2.

The first iteration of this process produces the outline of a hexagram.

The Koch snowflake is the limit approached as the above steps are followed indefinitely. The Koch curve originally described by Helge von Koch is constructed using only one of the three sides of the original triangle. In other words, three Koch curves make a Koch snowflake.

A Koch curve–based representation of a nominally flat surface can similarly be created by repeatedly segmenting each line in a sawtooth pattern of segments with a given angle.

Properties

Perimeter of the Koch snowflake

Each iteration multiplies the number of sides in the Koch snowflake by four, so the number of sides after  iterations is given by:

If the original equilateral triangle has sides of length , the length of each side of the snowflake after  iterations is:

an inverse power of three multiple of the original length.
The perimeter of the snowflake after  iterations is:

Each iteration creates four times as many line segments as in the previous iteration, with the length of each one being  the length of the segments in the previous stage. Hence, the length of the curve after  iterations will be  times the original triangle perimeter and is unbounded, as  tends to infinity.

Limit of perimeter

As the number of iterations tends to infinity, the limit of the perimeter is:

since .

An -dimensional measure exists, but has not been calculated so far. Only upper and lower bounds have been invented.

Area of the Koch snowflake

In each iteration a new triangle is added on each side of the previous iteration, so the number of new triangles added in iteration  is:

where  is the area of the original triangle. The total new area added in iteration  is therefore:

The total area of the snowflake after  iterations is:

Collapsing the geometric sum gives:

Limits of area

The limit of the area is:

since .

Expressed in terms of the side length  of the original triangle, this is:

Solid of revolution 
The volume of the solid of revolution of the Koch snowflake about an axis of symmetry of the initiating equilateral triangle of unit side is

Other properties
The Koch snowflake is self-replicating  with six smaller copies surrounding one larger copy at the center. Hence, it is an irrep-7 irrep-tile (see Rep-tile for discussion).

This is greater than that of a line but less than that of Peano's space-filling curve.

The Koch curve is continuous everywhere, but differentiable nowhere.

Tessellation of the plane

It is possible to tessellate the plane by copies of Koch snowflakes in two different sizes. However, such a tessellation is not possible using only snowflakes of one size. Since each Koch snowflake in the tessellation can be subdivided into seven smaller snowflakes of two different sizes, it is also possible to find tessellations that use more than two sizes at once. Koch snowflakes and Koch antisnowflakes of the same size may be used to tile the plane.

Thue–Morse sequence and turtle graphics 
A turtle graphic is the curve that is generated if an automaton is programmed with a sequence.
If the Thue–Morse sequence members are used in order to select program states:

 If , move ahead by one unit,

the resulting curve converges to the Koch snowflake.

Representation as Lindenmayer system
The Koch curve can be expressed by the following rewrite system (Lindenmayer system):

Alphabet :   F
Constants :   +, −
Axiom :   F
Production rules:
       F → F+F--F+F

Here, F means "draw forward", - means "turn right 60°", and + means "turn left 60°".

To create the Koch snowflake, one would use F--F--F (an equilateral triangle) as the axiom.

Variants of the Koch curve 

Following von Koch's concept, several variants of the Koch curve were designed, considering right angles (quadratic), other angles (Cesàro), circles and polyhedra and their extensions to higher dimensions (Sphereflake and Kochcube, respectively)

Squares can be used to generate similar fractal curves. Starting with a unit square and adding to each side at each iteration a square with dimension one third of the squares in the previous iteration, it can be shown that both the length of the perimeter and the total area are determined by geometric progressions. The progression for the area converges to  while the progression for the perimeter diverges to infinity, so as in the case of the Koch snowflake, we have a finite area bounded by an infinite fractal curve. The resulting area fills a square with the same center as the original, but twice the area, and rotated by  radians, the perimeter touching but never overlapping itself.

The total area covered at the th iteration is:

while the total length of the perimeter is:

which approaches infinity as  increases.

See also 
 List of fractals by Hausdorff dimension
 Gabriel's Horn (infinite surface area but encloses a finite volume)
 Gosper curve (also known as the Peano–Gosper curve or flowsnake)
 Osgood curve
 Self-similarity    
 Teragon
 Weierstrass function
 Coastline paradox

References

Further reading

External links 

The Koch Curve poem by Bernt Wahl, Wahl.org. Retrieved 23 September 2019.

Application of the Koch curve to an antenna
A WebGL animation showing the construction of the Koch surface, tchaumeny.github.io. Retrieved 23 September 2019.

De Rham curves
L-systems